Senjedu may refer to:
 Senjedu, South Khorasan